Pedro Rodrigues Filho (17 June 1954 – 5 March 2023), also known as , Killer Lil' Pedro, Killer Killer Petey, or simply Killer Petey, was a Brazilian serial killer, spree killer, and vigilante known for pursuing and killing exclusively suspected criminals as a teenager, between the age of 14 and 19, in particular an entire gang in response to the murder of his pregnant girlfriend. Officially sentenced for 71 murders but claiming to have killed over 100 drug dealers, rapists, and murderers, he served 34 years in prison (about 25 weeks per murder) before his release in 2007. In 2011,  Rodrigues was imprisoned again on charges of inciting riot and deprivation of liberty; he was sentenced to eight years in prison, but was released again in 2018 after seven years on good behavior.

Since his second release from prison in 2018, after announcing himself to be reformed from his self-declared vigilantism as a youth, and committed to not committing any more crimes, Rodrigues was considered a Brazilian celebrity and YouTuber, maintaining a YouTube channel called Pedrinho EX Matador, commenting on modern crimes while educating the public that criminal acts are not something to be proud of.

Following Rodrigues' initial planned 2003 release, author Jeff Lindsay began publishing a novel series about a fictional American serial killer of killers inspired by Rodrigues, named Dexter Morgan. The series's success, along with that of its 2006 television adaptation and 2022 revival, led to widespread retrospective media attention being brought to Rodrigues, with him becoming internationally known alternately both as the "Brazilian Dexter" and the "South American Punisher" (after the Marvel Comics character of the same name).

Early life
Rodrigues was born on a farm in Santa Rita do Sapucaí, south of Minas Gerais. His skull had been bruised as a result of his father kicking his pregnant mother's belly during a fight. He claimed he felt the urge to kill for the first time at age 13—when in a fight with an older cousin, he pushed the young man into a sugar cane press, almost killing him, and had considered leaving him there to die before electing to save him.

Crime spree
At age 14, Rodrigues shot the deputy mayor of Santa Rita do Sapucaí in front of the city hall for having fired his father, a school guard, over accusations of stealing food from the school kitchen, preventing him from gaining new employment, before shooting the security guard whom he suspected as the actual thief, using his grandfather's shotgun for both. On the run, Rodrigues took refuge in Mogi das Cruzes, Greater São Paulo, where he began robbing drug dens and killing drug traffickers, making him a celebrity in the news media as the vigilante "Pedrinho Matador" (Lil’ Petey Killer). 

Rodrigues soon met Maria Aparecida Olympia, nicknamed Botinha, and they began living together. Rodrigues took on the duties of the deceased in a local street gang and was soon "forced" to eliminate some rivals, killing three ex-cronies. Botinha became pregnant with his child but was murdered shortly thereafter by a rival gang leader. Still underage, Rodrigues escaped, going on a revenge killing spree by tracking down and butchering every member of the rival gang.

First prison sentence and release
At the age of 19, Rodrigues was arrested for the first time on 24 May 1973, and lived in prison most of his adult years. Police records show that he was once transported in a vehicle with another prisoner, both handcuffed. During transport Rodrigues killed the other inmate without the police noticing. When they opened the car door and saw the other prisoner was dead Rodrigues said he did it because the man was a rapist. Although he was sentenced to 126 years' imprisonment, he was to be released in 2003, because Brazilian law at the time prohibited anyone from spending more than 30 years behind bars (revised to 40 years in 2019). After staying in prison for 34 years, Rodrigues was released on 24 April 2007, and he was reported to have moved to Fortaleza in Ceará.

Second prison sentence and release 
On 15 September 2011, Rodrigues was arrested at his rural home in Balneário Camboriú, where he worked as a caretaker. He was sentenced to eight years on charges such as riot and deprivation of liberty, committed while he was detained in São Paulo. He was released for good behaviour on 10 December 2018, after seven years.

Reformation and YouTube career
Since his second release from prison in 2018, after announcing himself to be retired from his self-declared vigilantism as a youth, and officially committed not to commit any more crimes, Rodrigues became a YouTuber, maintaining a YouTube channel called Pedrinho EX Matador, commenting on modern crimes, campaigning against gang violence and teaching the public to be not proud of criminal acts.

Death 
At about 10 a.m. on 5 March 2023, Rodrigues was shot and killed by two men firing from a car in Mogi das Cruzes, who then fled in another car. No suspects have been arrested.

In popular culture 
Following his initial planned 2003 release, Rodrigues was the principal inspiration for Dexter Morgan, the antihero protagonist of the 2004 Dexter book series written by Jeff Lindsay, as well as its 2006 television series adaptation of the same name by James Manos Jr., in which he is primarily portrayed by Michael C. Hall, who won a Golden Globe Award for Best Actor in a Television Series or Drama and Television Critics Association Award for Individual Achievement in Drama and was nominated five times for a Primetime Emmy Award for Outstanding Lead Actor in a Drama Series for his portrayal of the character, before reprising his role as Dexter in the 2021–22 revival miniseries Dexter: New Blood by Clyde Phillips. The success of the novel series and Showtime television franchise additionally led to Rodrigues acquiring the new international media nickname of "'The Brazilian Dexter". Rodrigues was also the basis for the characters of Takumi Hijirihara and Shuji Fujigawa in the 2016 Danganronpa manga series Danganronpa Gaiden: Killer Killer by series creator Kazutaka Kodaka; originally developed for the anime series Danganronpa 3: The End of Hope's Peak High School, to which Killer Killer was released as a tie-in, the character of Takumi had first been mentioned in Kodaka's 2012 video game Danganronpa 2: Goodbye Despair as "Sparkling Justice".

Because of the list of crimes and his behavior in jail, Rodrigues joined the list of killers quoted by writer Ilana Casoy in the book Serial Killers – Made in Brazil. The publication tells stories of murderers like Marcelo Costa de Andrade and Francisco da Costa Rocha.

See also
 List of serial killers by country
 List of serial killers by number of victims
 Dexter Morgan, a fictional American serial killer of killers inspired by Rodrigues.
 Dexter, a 2004 novel series about Morgan.
 Dexter, a 2006 television series about Morgan.
 Dexter: New Blood, a 2022 limited series revival of Dexter.
 Killer Killer, a 2016 manga series about serial killers of killers, inspired by Rodrigues.

References

1954 births
2023 deaths
20th-century criminals
21st-century philanthropists
Brazilian serial killers
Brazilian YouTubers
Charity fundraisers (people)
Comedy YouTubers
Gaming YouTubers
Gaming-related YouTube channels
Let's Players
Deaths by firearm in Brazil
Male serial killers
Murdered serial killers
People from Minas Gerais
People with antisocial personality disorder
People with paranoid personality disorder
Video bloggers
Vigilantes
YouTube channels
YouTube channels launched in 2018
YouTube vloggers